The City of Playford Library Service is the public library service of the City of Playford which is located in the northern suburbs of Adelaide, South Australia.

The City of Playford Library Service consists of the branch Libraries in Elizabeth (Playford Civic Centre) and Munno Para (Stretton Centre), the Mobile and Home Library Service.

As of October 2011 the Library has over 66,000 registered borrowers and a collection exceeding 107,000 items.

History 

The Elizabeth South Public Library was opened on 4 December 1957 by Sir Thomas Playford,
making it the first free municipal public Library to open in Adelaide.

Sir Thomas was the first to join and become Member No 1A in Library No. A1!

Subsequent branches were constructed over the intervening years:

Elizabeth North opened 4 July 1960
Elizabeth Town Centre opened 15 September 1969

The first Munno Para Library was opened on 5 February 1966.

In 2005 the Elizabeth Civic Centre and Munno Para (Smithfield) branches opened in their present premises.

In December 2007 the Playford Library Service celebrated its 50th birthday.  This included a celebration event involving past and present staff including the first chief Librarian, Warwick Dunstun and a well attended community birthday party.

Youth focus Library 

The Smithfield Library, located in the Munno Para Shopping Centre, was planned and constructed with a dedicated focus on youth and innovation.

The design is not one that is found in a 'traditional' Library and features the use of vibrant colours, banks of music listening stations, Xbox game consoles, flat screen televisions displaying music and news channels and a see through staff work area.

It was awarded the South Australian Chapter Design Institute of Australia 2004 Award of Merit and short listed in the Public/Institutional Interior Design Category of the 2005 Interior Design Awards.

See also
City of Playford
State Library of South Australia
List of Libraries

References

External links
City of Playford Library
City of Playford Library Service
Library Catalogue
A library of the future: the Playford Library, South Australia by Kym Gravener, ALIA inCite article, August 2005

Playford, City of
Libraries in South Australia
Libraries established in 1957
1957 establishments in Australia